Louise van Holthe tot Echten (1892-1981) was a Dutch painter.

Biography 
Holthe tot Echten was born on 26 March 1892 in Utrecht. She studied with Henk Bremmer and Nicolas Eekman. She was a member of the Schilder- en teekengenootschap Kunstliefde (Utrecht).  Holthe tot Echten's work was included in the 1939 exhibition and sale Onze Kunst van Heden (Our Art of Today) at the Rijksmuseum in Amsterdam.
Holthe tot Echten died on 20 November 1981  in Doorn.

References

1892 births
1981 deaths
Artists from Utrecht
20th-century Dutch women artists
Dutch painters